Hishin-e Olya (also Romanized as Ḩīshīn-e ‘Olyā; also known as Ḩīshīn and Moḩammadābād-e Ḩīshīn) is a village in Rezvan Rural District, Jebalbarez District, Jiroft County, Kerman Province, Iran. At the 2006 census, its population was 136, in 33 families.

References 

Populated places in Jiroft County